is a museum of letters in Sakai city, Fukui Prefecture, Japan. It opened on 23 August 2015.

History 
 1993 - Open call for applications for poetry prize "One-stroke Enlightenment Award". The number of first applications was 32,236.
 1994 - Foundation of the Maruoka Town Culture Promotion Agency was established.
 1 April 2013 - Changed name to Maruoka Cultural Foundation from Maruoka Town Culture Promotion Agency.
 September 2013 - Maruoka Cultural Foundation announced a policy to make the former clinic site of Maruoka Castle west side about museum construction site. But this policy can not get the local consent because planned construction site hitting the former Uchibori (moat). So Maruoka Cultural Foundation changed museum construction site in the north side of Maruoka Castle Change to Foundation site.
 6 June 2014 - Because Ishigaki of Maruoka Castle Ninomaru was excavated from the site of Maruoka Cultural Foundation, the construction site was changed in the parking lot on the north side of Sakai City Maruoka Library (the second change).
 23 August 2015 - Brief Messages from the Heart Museum has opened.

Facility 
 Wooden two-story 
 Total floor area 700 square meters
 Permanent exhibition room - You can see the prize-winning works so far along with the history of poetry prize "One-stroke Enlightenment Award".
 Planning exhibition room - A collaboration piece of the picture of the kamaboko board in Saiyo City, Ehime prefecture and the Japan's shortest letter is displayed.
 The old castle exhibition room - It is almost the same area as the third floor of the Maruoka castle tower, and you can watch a video about Sakai city.
 Fumi Garden - Cafe

Usage guide

Opening time 
 9:00 - 17:00（admission is until 16:30）

Closing day 
 Year-end and New Year. (from 29 December to 3 January)
 There is closed day for display change.

Access

Railway 
 40 minutes by JR Fukui Station on the Keifuku Bus "Maruoka Line", 8 minutes by walk from the "Maruoka Castle" bus stop
 20 minutes by JR Awara Onsen Station on the Keifuku Bus "Eiheiji and Tojinbo Line", 10 minutes by walk from "Castle Entrance" bus stop

Car 
 5 minutes from Hokuriku Expressway Maruoka Interchange

One-stroke Enlightenment Award

One-stroke Enlightenment Award (1993–2002)

New One-stroke Enlightenment Award (2003–)

Surroundings 
 Sakai City Maruoka Library—Adjacent to the letter hall. Attached Nakano Shigeharu memorial paperback.

References

External links 
 
 

Museums established in 2015
Museums in Fukui Prefecture
Sakai, Fukui